Professional Rapper may refer to:

 Professional Rapper (John Reuben album), a Christian hip hop album released in 2003
 Professional Rapper (Lil Dicky album), released in 2015
 "Professional Rapper" (song), the second single from the Lil Dicky album